George Lawton (born 1880; date of death unknown) was an English footballer who played in the Football League for Stoke.

Career
Lawton was born in Tunstall, Staffordshire and joined Burslem Port Vale in April 1896. He made his debut at the Athletic Ground on 20 February 1897, in an 8–0 win over Grantham Rovers in the Midland League. He lost his first team place in October 1897, and left the club the following year. He then played for local amateur club Porthill. He played one match for Stoke in 1901–02 as first choice 'keeper Tom Wilkes was injured and Lawton played against Bury on 12 October 1901 where he conceded four goals in a 4–2 defeat. He returned to amateur football with Tunstall  and then Porthill again.

Career statistics

References

People from Tunstall, Staffordshire
English footballers
Association football goalkeepers
Port Vale F.C. players
Stoke City F.C. players
Midland Football League players
English Football League players
1880 births
Year of death missing